MPIO may refer to:

 Multipath I/O
 Mpio, a former Korean electronics manufacturer known for portable media players

See also 
 MIMO